Thanabalan a/l Nadarajah (born in 1943) was a Malaysian former footballer. He is remembered for his contribution during the Merdeka Tournament in 1968. Malaysia won the trophy by beating Burma 3–0 in the final. Thanabalan scored one of the three goals. Thanabalan scored 20 international goals in 46 appearances for Malaysia.

He was also one of the three players who had scored four goals in a Malaysia Cup final after Lee Ah Loke(1952) and Abdul Ghani Minhat(1963) in 1968.

On 23 September 2011, he was awarded the special award by Ex-State & Ex-National Footballers Association of Malaysia for being a top scorer in the final of the Malaysia Cup competition.

In 2013, he was inducted in Olympic Council of Malaysia's Hall of Fame.

Honours 
Selangor
 Malaysia Cup (7): 1961, 1962, 1963, 1966, 1968, 1969, 1971
 Malaysia FAM Cup (5): 1960, 1961, 1962, 1966, 1968

International 
Malaya U-20
 AFC Youth Championship runner-up: 1960

Malaysia
 Pestabola Merdeka: 1968

References

Malaysian footballers
People from Selangor
Selangor FA players
1943 births
Malaysia international footballers
Association football forwards
Living people
Malaysian people of Tamil descent
Malaysian sportspeople of Indian descent